Algonova may refer to:

 Algonova (1968), a single-hulled oil tanker 
 Algonova (2008), a double-hulled tanker